Neophasia terlooii, the Chiricahua white, Chiricahua pine white, or Mexican pine white is a butterfly in the family Pieridae. It is found in New Mexico, in the high mountains of Arizona, and south into Mexico. The habitat consists of forests of needled conifers - Family Pinaceae.

Males are white and resemble Neophasia menapia.

References

Neophasia
Butterflies of North America
Butterflies described in 1869
Taxa named by Hans Hermann Behr